Soysal is a Turkish surname. Notable people with the surname include:

 Ayşe Soysal, Turkish mathematician
 Mümtaz Soysal, Turkish professor of constitutional law, political scientist, Kemalist politician, human rights activist, ex-prisoner of conscience, senior advisor, columnist and author
 Yusuf Soysal, Turkish footballer

 Fethullah Selim SOYSAL, Turkish Lawyer

Turkish-language surnames

de:Soysal